Netsch is a surname. Notable people with the surname include:

Dawn Clark Netsch (1926–2013), American lawyer and politician
Walter Netsch (1920–2008), American architect